Neuraphes is a genus of beetles belonging to the family Staphylinidae.

The species of this genus are found in Europe and Africa.

Species:
 Neuraphes agriatensis Orousset, 2013 
 Neuraphes alexandrisi Franz, 1980

References

Staphylinidae
Staphylinidae genera